The 2019 Challenger Banque Nationale de Granby was a professional tennis tournament played on outdoor hard courts. It was the twenty-sixth (men) and ninth (women) editions of the tournament which was part of the 2019 ATP Challenger Tour and the 2019 ITF Women's World Tennis Tour. It took place in Granby, Quebec, Canada between 22 and 28 July 2019.

Men's singles main-draw entrants

Seeds

1 Rankings are as of July 15, 2019.

Other entrants
The following players received wildcards into the singles main draw:
 Taha Baadi
 Justin Boulais
 Brandon Holt
 Nicaise Muamba
 Vasek Pospisil

The following players received entry into the singles main draw as alternates:
 André Göransson
 Sem Verbeek

The following players received entry into the singles main draw using their ITF World Tennis Ranking:
 Jordi Arconada
 Evan Hoyt
 Alexander Lebedev
 Skander Mansouri
 Yannick Mertens
 Issei Okamura
 Joshua Peck

The following players received entry from the qualifying draw:
 Kooros Ghasemi
 Hunter Reese

Women's singles main-draw entrants

Seeds

 1 Rankings are as of 15 July 2019.

Other entrants
The following players received wildcards into the singles main draw:
  Françoise Abanda
  Carson Branstine
  Petra Januskova
  Carol Zhao

The following players received entry from the qualifying draw:
  Ariana Arseneault
  Andreea Ghițescu
  Nika Kukharchuk
  Anna Morgina
  Ingrid Neel
  Erin Routliffe

The following player received entry as a Lucky Loser:
  Layne Sleeth

Champions

Men's singles

 Ernesto Escobedo def.  Yasutaka Uchiyama 7–6(7–5), 6–4.

Women's singles

 Lizette Cabrera def.  Leylah Annie Fernandez, 6–1, 6–4

Men's doubles

 André Göransson /  Sem Verbeek def.  Li Zhe /  Hugo Nys 6–2, 6–4.

Women's doubles

 Haruka Kaji /  Junri Namigata def.  Quinn Gleason /  Ingrid Neel, 7–6(7–5), 5–7, [10–8]

References

External links
 2019 Challenger Banque Nationale de Granby at ITFtennis.com
 Official website

2019 ITF Women's World Tennis Tour
2019 ATP Challenger Tour
2019 in Canadian tennis
Challenger de Granby
July 2019 sports events in Canada